The Dutch Eredivisie in the 1985–86 season was contested by 18 teams. PSV won the championship.

League standings

Results

See also
 1985–86 Eerste Divisie
 1985–86 KNVB Cup

References

 Eredivisie official website - info on all seasons 
 RSSSF

Eredivisie seasons
Netherlands
1985–86 in Dutch football